Hornbæk is a seaside resort town on the north coast of the Danish island of Sjælland, facing the Øresund which separates Denmark from Sweden. It is part of Helsingør Municipality and is located 12 km north-west of Helsingør, and is mainly known for its fashionable holiday homes and broad sandy beaches.

As of 2020, Hornbæk proper has a population of 3,641 but since 2010 it has grown together with neighbouring Dronningmølle in Gribskov Municipality, forming an urban area with a combined population of 5,334.

History
Hornbæk was originally a small fishing village around a natural harbour. In 1706, as the first of a number of Danish reforestation initiatives, the Hornbæk Plantage was planted east of the village to prevent entrainment of the sandy soils.

In the late 18th century, it was common practice for people from Copenhagen to spend their summers in the countryside north of the city and a number of artists began lodging in Hornbæk, either in the local inns or privately. Among these were Peder Severin Krøyer, Holger Drachmann and Carl Locher before they moved on to Skagen and formed the Skagen colony. Kristian Zahrtmann, another prominent Danish painter of the time, also spend time in Hornbæk.

Gradually an industry of boarding houses and seaside hotels emerged and many summer residents bought land and built houses.

August Strindberg and Harriet Bosse visited Hornbæk in 1901 on a dramatic trip, a substitute for their honeymoon which Strindberg called off at the last moment. She went to Hornbæk alone and he later followed but they left after he attacked a photographer who wanted to take a picture of Bosse in her bathing costume.

When the Hornbæk Railway Line was inaugurated on 22 May 1906, the town was invaded by tourists. Bathing jetties and bathing huts were common along the coast.

Landmarks
Landmarks include Hornbæk Church, Hotel Bretagne and Hotel Hornbækhus.

Transport
Hornbæk is connected to Helsingør and Gilleleje by Hornbæk Railway.

Cultural references
Hornbæk station is used as a location at 1:01:32 in the first Olsen Gang film.

Other notable people 
 Caroline Hammer (1832 in Hulerød near Hornbæk - 1915) one of the earliest professional women photographers in Denmark. 
 Erna Juel-Hansen (1845 – 1922 in Hornbæk) a novelist and early women's rights activist
 Henrik B. Andersen (born 1958 in Hornbæk) a sculptor, professor at the Vilnius Academy of Art in Lithuania since 2008
 Maria Jespersen (born 1991 in Hornbæk) a Danish tennis player.
 Victor Nelsson (born 1998 in Hornbæk) a Danish footballer who plays as a centre back for Galatasaray.

References

Cities and towns in the Capital Region of Denmark
Helsingør Municipality
Fishing communities in Denmark